Dysphania may refer to:

 Dysphania (moth), a Lepidoptera animal genus
 Dysphania (plant), an Amaranthaceae plant genus